The 1918 United States Senate election in Texas was held on November 5, 1918. Incumbent Democratic U.S. Senator Morris Sheppard was re-elected to a second term in office easily.

General election

Results

See also 
 1918 United States Senate elections

References 

Texas
1918
Senate